The US Festival (US pronounced like the pronoun, not as initials) was the name of two early 1980s music and culture festivals in southern California, held  east of Los Angeles, near San Bernardino.

Background
Steve Wozniak, cofounder of Apple and creator of the Apple I and Apple II personal computers, believed that the 1970s were the "Me" generation. He intended the US Festivals, with Bill Graham's participation, to encourage the 1980s to be more community-oriented and combine technology with rock music. The first was held Labor Day weekend in September 1982,  and the second was less than nine months later, over Memorial Day weekend in May 1983.

Wozniak paid for the bulldozing and construction of a new open-air field venue as well as the construction of an enormous state-of-the-art temporary stage at Glen Helen Regional Park near Devore, San Bernardino, California, just south of the junction of Interstates 15 and 215.  (This site was later to become home to Blockbuster Pavilion—now Glen Helen Amphitheater—the largest amphitheatre in the United States .) The festival stage has resided at Disneyland in Anaheim since 1985, and has operated under various names and functions as the Videopolis dance club, the Videopolis Theatre, and the Fantasyland Theater.

Labor Day Weekend, 1982
The festival ran for three days in early September in  weather; there were 36 arrests, and a reported twelve drug overdoses. One "associated" murder of a hitchhiker occurred the day after the event. The festival lost a reported $12 million, and total attendance for the three days was about 400,000. The price for a three-day ticket was $37.50  (approximately $100 in 2021 money).

The US festival featured the first implementation of the U.S.-Soviet Space Bridge, a two-way satellite hookup between the United States and the Soviet Union. Organizers had planned to have the US Festival and Soviet rock fans interact as a way to promote goodwill between the Cold War rivals, but it was too dark in California for cameras to pick up the festivalgoers when the link went live.

(Bands are listed below in the order they appeared.)

Friday, September 3
 Gang of Four
 Ramones
 The Beat
 Oingo Boingo
 The B-52's
 Talking Heads
 The Police

Saturday, September 4
 Dave Edmunds
 Eddie Money
 Santana
 The Cars
 The Kinks
 Pat Benatar
 Tom Petty and the Heartbreakers

Sunday, September 5
 Grateful Dead
 Jerry Jeff Walker
 Jimmy Buffett and The Coral Reefer Band
 Jackson Browne
 Fleetwood Mac

Memorial Day Weekend, 1983
The reprise festival ran for three  and the festival still lost $12 million; adays, this time at the helm was Colorado-based promoter Barry Fey, who with Wozniak added a fourth Country Day a week later. The total attendance  was reported at 670,000s Van Halen was reportedly paid $1.5 million to perform. There were two reported deaths.

Saturday, May 28 (New Wave Day)

 Divinyls
 INXS
 Wall of Voodoo 
 Oingo Boingo
 The English Beat
 A Flock of Seagulls
 Stray Cats
 Men at Work
 The Clash

Sunday, May 29 (Heavy Metal Day)
 Quiet Riot
 Mötley Crüe 
 Ozzy Osbourne
 Judas Priest
 Triumph
 Scorpions
 Van Halen

Monday, May 30 (Rock Day)
 Los Lobos 
 Little Steven & The Disciples of Soul
 Quarterflash
 Berlin
 Missing Persons
 U2
 The Pretenders
 Joe Walsh
 Stevie Nicks
 David Bowie

Saturday June 4th (Country Day)
 The Thrasher Brothers
 Ricky Skaggs
 Hank Williams, Jr.
 Emmylou Harris & The Hot Band
 Alabama
 Waylon Jennings
 Riders in the Sky
 Willie Nelson

In popular culture
The festival was parodied in the comic strip Bloom County, when Milo and his friends organize their own version of the "US Festival" as a political fundraiser for their Meadow Party. In this case, the name comes from the fact that the proceeds of the concert will "go to us!", as in the promoters when asked in a fourth wall inquiry. Several well-known groups and musicians make cameo appearances like actual US Festival headliners Van Halen  and The Police  to more fictionalized ones by Boy George with Culture Club, Barry Manilow and the fictional heavy metal band Tess Turbo and The Blackheads.

In 1984, "Weird Al" Yankovic parodied the US Festival (and its heavy financial losses) on an episode of Al TV, claiming that there would be a third edition of the festival, but without any live bands; the entire show would be released only on a cassette tape.

Home video releases
In 2003, the band Triumph released a DVD of their US Festival performance, Live at the US Festival. In 2011 Shout! Factory announced plans to release a series of live concert DVDs from the US Festival. The first two of these releases, Willie Nelson and Waylon Jennings, were released on November 15, 2011. The third DVD release from Shout! Factory was Quiet Riot, released on March 27, 2012.

On September 18, 2012, Shout! Factory released The English Beat: Live At The US Festival, ’82 & ’83 on CD/DVD.

On November 19, 2013, Icon Television Music released The US Festival 1983 Days 1-3 on iTunes. This is the only US Festival release authorized by Steve Wozniak and the Unuson Corporation.

Judas Priest's 30-year anniversary release of Screaming for Vengeance included a DVD with footage of their set from their 1983 appearance.

See also

List of historic rock festivals

References

Further reading

External links
 Steve Wozniak's US Festivals site
 Softalk magazine's 1982 article on the festival
 Video coverage of U2s set May 30, 1983
 The US Festival 1982: The US Generation Documentary | Amplified (2017)
 US Festival 1983 Days 1-3 (2009) Documentary (IMDB)

1982 in music
1983 in music
1982 establishments in the United States
Music festivals established in 1982
Pop music festivals in the United States
Rock festivals in the United States